Polybasic may refer to:
 A polybasic or polyprotic acid, able to donate more than one proton per molecule
 A polybasic salt, with more than one hydrogen atom, with respect to the parent acid, replaced by cations

See also

Monobasic (disambiguation)
Dibasic (disambiguation)
Tribasic (disambiguation)

Chemical nomenclature